George Louis Elliot Thorne (born 4 January 1993) is an English footballer and was part of England's Under 17 European Championship winning side in 2010. He currently plays for Southern League Central Premier club Bedford Town, having previously played at England Youth and Premiership level. He operates as a midfielder.

Club career

West Bromwich Albion
Born in Chatham, Thorne joined West Bromwich Albion's Academy in 2005, having been one of the many talented youngsters who were left without a club when Cambridge United's youth scheme closed. He made his debut in a 4–0 win over Sheffield Wednesday in 2009–10, coming off the bench for Simon Cox. At 16 years, 328 days, this made him the youngest player to represent Albion in a senior competitive match since Bobby Hope in April 1960. In January 2010, Thorne signed his first professional contract with Albion, doing so prior to the club's home game with Nottingham Forest.

Portsmouth (loan)
On 24 November 2011, Thorne joined Championship team Portsmouth on loan until 2 January 2012, alongside Joe Mattock. He made his début two days later, starting in a 1–1 draw against Leicester City at Fratton Park. On 20 December 2011, he was recalled along with two other players also on loan at other clubs due to an injury crisis. On 18 February 2012, he rejoined Portsmouth on loan. He made his second debut in a 2–0 defeat against Barnsley the same day. On 30 March, he suffered an ankle injury in the game against Burnley, being ruled out for the rest of the season, and returning to West Brom.

Peterborough United (loan)
On 21 November 2012, he joined Peterborough United on loan until January. He made his debut three days later, helping Peterborough secure a 1–1 draw away to Ipswich Town. He scored his first goal on 22 December in a 5–4 win against Bolton Wanderers.

Return to West Brom
On 28 December 2012, West Brom manager Steve Clarke recalled Thorne from Peterborough. Two days later, Thorne started in central midfield in a Premier League clash with Manchester United.

Watford (loan)
On 6 November 2013, Thorne went out on loan to Watford until 2 January 2014.

Derby County (loan)
On 30 January 2014, Thorne went out on loan to Derby County for the remainder of the 2013–14 season. Thorne's first appearance for Derby County came in their 5–0 win against rivals Nottingham Forest in March 2014. He scored his first goal for Derby against Doncaster on 18 April 2014. He played his final game of the loan spell for the Rams in the Championship Play-off Final at Wembley, where his side lost 1–0 to QPR.

Derby County
On 18 July 2014, Derby County agreed a fee with West Bromwich Albion for Thorne. The following day, after agreeing personal terms and passing a medical, Thorne joined Derby on a four-year contract. It is predicted the fee was between £2.6 million and £3.2 million.

On 22 July 2014, Thorne suffered a cruciate knee ligament injury during a friendly match against Zenit Saint Petersburg and was ruled out of football for up to nine months.

Having fought hard to get back to fitness and into the first team again, on 7 May 2016, Thorne suffered a broken leg during the final league game of the season against Ipswich Town and was ruled out of football for over a year. This was due to a number of complications during operations and his recovery, and despite having the ability and football brain, he was physically not the same player after this injury.

Thorne joined League One club Luton Town on 7 January 2019 on loan until the end of 2018–19.

Oxford United
He joined another League One club, Oxford United, on 19 August 2019 on loan until January 2020. The loan was made permanent on 22 January 2020, with Thorne signing a contract until the end of the 2019–20 season. In August 2020, Oxford announced that Thorne has been released by mutual consent.

Bedford Town
On 12 September 2022, Thorne signed for Southern League Premier Division Central club Bedford Town.

International career
Thorne was called up to England Under-16 on 23 October 2008 for the Victory Shield, in which England had to face Wales U16. He made his England U16 debut, coming on in the 58th minute and making an assist for England. In May 2010, Thorne helped the under-17 team win their first ever European Championship, coming off the bench in the final as England triumphed 2–1 over Spain.

Personal life 
Thorne announced his retirement from full time professional football during a BBC Radio Derby commentary on 23 August 2022, he cited his multiple injuries, mental health and family as the main factors of his decision.

Career statistics

Honours
England U17
UEFA European Under-17 Football Championship champions: 2010

References

External links

1993 births
Living people
Sportspeople from Chatham, Kent
Footballers from Kent
English footballers
England youth international footballers
Association football midfielders
West Bromwich Albion F.C. players
Portsmouth F.C. players
Peterborough United F.C. players
Watford F.C. players
Derby County F.C. players
Luton Town F.C. players
Oxford United F.C. players
Bedford Town F.C. players
English Football League players
Premier League players
Southern Football League players